Greg Brown is a journeyman American sportscaster, born in Washington, D.C., who has worked as a play-by-play announcer for the Pittsburgh Pirates on AT&T SportsNet Pittsburgh and KDKA-FM since 1994. He works with Bob Walk, and John Wehner. Originally, Brown called games with Lanny Frattare until Frattare retired after the 2008 season.

Brown grew up in Mechanicsburg, Pennsylvania. He became a Pirates fan through the broadcasts on KDKA radio and would visit Pittsburgh each summer with his parents to see baseball games at Three Rivers Stadium. Brown enrolled at Point Park College and landed an internship with the Pirates' promotion department in 1979, where his duties included serving as the inaugural backup Pirate Parrot. (The Pirates would go on to win the World Series that year.) He then worked in the Pirates' front office for 10 years in a variety of roles for the sales, broadcasting and public relations departments. He was the public address announcer in 1987 and did weekend sports anchoring at WFMJ-TV in Youngstown, Ohio in 1988.

Brown spent five seasons (1989–93) doing play-by-play for the Pirates' Class AAA affiliate in Buffalo, NY. He also hosted a sports talk show on WGR radio. For three seasons (1991–93), Brown was the color analyst on Buffalo Bills radio broadcasts and also hosted pre-game and post-game shows for the Bills games. (The Bills would advance to the Super Bowl in each of Brown's three seasons as a broadcaster.) He also called basketball games for the Buffalo Bulls.

Brown is known as a franchise apologist and for his call of "Raise the Jolly Roger" after every Pirates victory.  This is keeping in line with Pirate broadcasters, such as Lanny Frattare and Bob Prince, who also ended each Pirate win with a distinctive statement ("We had 'em all the way!" for Prince and "There was no doubt about it!" for Frattare).  He is also known to exclaim "Clear the deck, cannonball coming!" on home runs hit by the Pirates, as well as "It's a trip-trip-triple!" when Pirates players hit triples.

A report by Minnesota based Bring Me The News declared Brown the losingest active play by play announcer in MLB. At the time of the article, Brown had called 2,133 losses and held a .454 winning percentage.

Brown and his wife Kim have one son, Ryan.

See also
 Pittsburgh Pirates broadcasters and media

References 
Root Sports Pittsburgh broadcaster bios (Greg Brown)
Greg Brown's Pirates Photoblog
Ranking MLB TV announcers by winning percentage of games they've called
DingoTalk Interview with Carlo Guadagnino

Year of birth missing (living people)
Living people
American radio sports announcers
American television sports announcers
Buffalo Bills announcers
College basketball announcers in the United States
Major League Baseball public address announcers
Major League Baseball broadcasters
National Football League announcers
People from Mechanicsburg, Pennsylvania
Radio personalities from Washington, D.C.
Pittsburgh Pirates announcers
Point Park University alumni